This page is an overview of 'Kazakhstan at the UCI Track Cycling World Championships.

2015  

Kazakhstan competed at the 2016 UCI Track Cycling World Championships at the Lee Valley VeloPark in London, United Kingdom from 2–4 March 2016. A team of 3 cyclists (0 women, 3 men) was announced to represent the country in the event.

Results

Men

Sources

References

Nations at the UCI Track Cycling World Championships
Kazakhstan at cycling events